Jacen Rex Orlando Russell-Rowe (born September 13, 2002) is a Canadian soccer player who plays as a forward for Columbus Crew in Major League Soccer.

Early life
He began playing soccer at age three with Brampton YSC. He later joined the Toronto FC Academy.

College career
In 2020, he committed to the University of Maryland, College Park where he would play for the Terrapins. In his debut for Maryland on February 19, 2021, he scored a goal from 30 yards out against the Penn State Nittany Lions for his first NCAA goal. On March 7, he scored the only goal in a 1-0 victory over the Wisconsin Badgers to give Maryland its first victory of the season. For his freshman season, he was named to the 2020/21 Big Ten All-Freshman Team.

Club career
In 2018, he made one appearance for Toronto FC III in League1 Ontario.
 
On July 3, 2019, he made his professional debut with Toronto FC II in USL League One (while on an academy contract), coming on as a substitute against FC Tucson.

In March 2022 Russell-Rowe signed with MLS Next Pro side Columbus Crew 2. He scored his first professional goal on April 10 against Philadelphia Union II. On May 28, he signed a short term loan with the first team, Columbus Crew, ahead of their MLS game against Atlanta United FC. On June 18, he signed another short-term loan with the Crew for their match against Charlotte FC, in which he appeared as a substitute for his MLS debut. Russell-Rowe was named MLS Next Pro Player of the Month for both May and June 2022. Russell-Rowe won the 2022 MLS Next Pro MVP, the 2022 MLS Next Pro Golden Boot Award after leading the league with 21 goals and was also named to the MLS Next Pro Best XI.

On June 29, 2022, Columbus traded $50,000 in General Allocation Money to acquire his homegrown rights from Toronto FC, and signed him to their first team's roster. He made his first MLS start the same day against Toronto FC, recording two assists in a 2–1 victory.

International career
In 2016, he made his debut in the Canadian youth program when was called to a training camp for the Canada U15 team.

Russell-Rowe represented Canada's Under-17 side at the 2019 CONCACAF U-17 Championship. He was subsequently named to the team for the 2019 FIFA U-17 World Cup, where he scored both of Canada's goals at the tournament. In 2019, he was a nominee for Canadian Youth International Player of the Year.

Career statistics

Club

Notes

References

External links
 
 

2002 births
Living people
Canadian soccer players
Canada men's youth international soccer players
Association football forwards
Soccer players from Toronto
Toronto FC II players
USL League One players
Maryland Terrapins men's soccer players
Black Canadian soccer players
MLS Next Pro players
Columbus Crew 2 players
Columbus Crew players
Major League Soccer players